The 2012 Patriot League men's soccer tournament will be the conference's 23rd edition of the tournament. The tournament began on November 9 and will end on November 11.

Qualification

Bracket

Schedule

Semifinals

Patriot League Championship

Statistical leaders

See also 
 Patriot League
 2012 in American soccer
 2012 NCAA Division I men's soccer season
 2012 NCAA Division I Men's Soccer Championship

References

External links 
 Patriot League Tournament Information

Tournament